Kyle Edmund was the defending champion but chose not to defend his title.

Ryan Harrison won the title after defeating Taylor Fritz 6–3, 6–3 in the final.

Seeds

Draw

Finals

Top half

Bottom half

References
Main Draw
Qualifying Draw

RBC Tennis Championships of Dallas - Singles
2017 Singles